San Francisco City Guides (SFCG) is a non-profit organization that offers over 90 different walking tours of San Francisco presented by trained, volunteer guides. San Francisco City Guides was founded in 1978 as a program of the San Francisco Public Library (SFPL) and the San Francisco Parks Alliance. Tours are offered daily, regardless of weather. Reservations are accepted  for groups of eight or more, as well as for special date or time requests.

History

Beginnings 
San Francisco City Guides was founded after frequent requests for a tour of City Hall. Gladys Hansen, City Archivist, San Francisco History Room, City Hall, trained a few volunteers to give tours of City Hall and the San Francisco Civic Center to dignitaries, visitors and students. There were no schedules and tours were provided on an as-needed basis.

With ever-increasing requests, Judith Waldhorn Lynch, who was hired through C.E.T.A. was assigned to work with Gladys in the History Room in 1977. Lynch set about recruiting volunteers and supporters to formally launch the program which would later be named “City Guides.”

The first training class produced 67 volunteer guides. City Hall/Civic Center was the single tour offered.

1980s 
In 1982, Mayor Dianne Feinstein asked City Guides be official guides for new Moscone Center. In 1984, City Guides was appointed as San Francisco's official Docent by Mayor Feinstein.

In 1986, City Guides was asked to be official Bridge Guides for the 50th Anniversary Celebration by the Friends of the Golden Gate Bridge; this tour became the eleventh regularly offered tour.

1990s 
San Francisco Public Library became City Guides' primary sponsor, while City Guides became a project of The Tides Center, which now serves as fiscal agent, replacing Friends of the Library in 1996.

2000s 
In 2001, City Guides received the Ron Ross Founders Award from the San Francisco History Association, in recognition of its invaluable contribution to the preservation of San Francisco history.

City Guides collaborated with San Francisco Beautiful and Wilderness Press to celebrate the 20th anniversary of a book written by a City Guide, Adan Bakalinsky, Stairway Walks in San Francisco in 2004.

In 2008, City Guides celebrated its 30th anniversary with an event held at the Main Library. In City Guides' 30th year, 30,000 walkers attended their tours.

In 2012, San Francisco City Guides started a partnership with the San Francisco Museum and Historical Society to provide historical, cultural and architectural walks.

Volunteers
City Guide volunteers form a diverse group, united by their passion for sharing San Francisco with others. Volunteers come from all over the Bay Area and have backgrounds such as teachers, engineers, students, retired professionals, lawyers, historians, real estate agents, journalists and even professional tour guides.

References

External links 
 

Organizations based in San Francisco
1978 establishments in California
Tour guides